Sergei Nikolaevich Mamchur (3 February 1972 – 26 December 1997) was a Russian football defender.

International
He was capped for the USSR U-20 team at the 1991 FIFA World Youth Championship.

Honours
 UEFA European Under-18 Championship champion: 1990

Death
He died in his Moscow apartment due to a heart failure. Mamchur was buried in his hometown Dnipro.

External links

 

1972 births
Footballers from Dnipro
1997 deaths
Soviet footballers
Soviet Union youth international footballers
Russian footballers
Association football defenders
Ukrainian emigrants to Russia
Russia under-21 international footballers
FC Asmaral Moscow players
PFC CSKA Moscow players
FC Dnipro players
Soviet Top League players
Russian Premier League players
Ukrainian Premier League players